The 2021 Jack's Casino World Series of Darts Finals was the seventh staging of the World Series of Darts Finals tournament, organised by the Professional Darts Corporation. The tournament took place at AFAS Live, Amsterdam, Netherlands, from 29 to 31 October 2021. It featured a field of 24 players.

Gerwyn Price was the defending champion, after beating Rob Cross 11–9 in the 2020 final, but lost to compatriot Jonny Clayton in the quarter-finals.

Clayton went on to win the title, defeating Dimitri Van den Bergh 11–6 in the final.

This was the first time the tournament had taken place without any representatives from outside Europe.

Prize money
The prize money remained the same as the previous year.

Qualification
Due to the COVID-19 pandemic still being prevalent in 2021, only one event took place on the 2021 World Series of Darts, which was the 2021 Nordic Darts Masters.

The eight PDC representatives who reached the quarter-finals of the Nordic Darts Masters were seeded for the World Series of Darts Finals. The other 16 places were filled up by:

The next 4 players on the PDC Order of Merit (after the World Grand Prix) who hadn't yet qualified
4 international representatives
4 Dutch representatives, with the event being held in Amsterdam
4 players being determined by a qualifier for Tour Card holders held on 18 October at Barnsley Metrodome, Barnsley.

The following players qualified for the tournament:

Draw

References

World Series of Darts
World Series of Darts
+2021
World Series of Darts Finals